The year 530 BC was a year of the pre-Julian Roman calendar. In the Roman Empire, it was known as year 224  Ab urbe condita. The denomination 530 BC for this year has been used since the early medieval period, when the Anno Domini calendar era became the prevalent method in Europe for naming years.

Events

By place

Asia 
 Cyrus II is killed in battle against unknown tribes and succeeded by Cambyses II.

By topic

Chronology 
 Royal Arch Masons use this year for dating their documents Anno Inventionis, after the beginning of the Second Temple by Zerubbabel.

Art and architecture 
 The Temple of Apollo at Delphi is built (approximate date).
 Peplos Kore, from the Acropolis in Athens, is made. It is now at Acropolis Museum, Athens (approximate date).
 Kroisos Kouros, from a cemetery at Anavysos near Athens, is made. It is now at the National Archaeological Museum, Athens (approximate date).
 The Siphnian Treasury in Delphi is begun (approximate date).
 Battle between the Gods and the Giants, fragments of the north frieze of the Siphnian Treasury, from the Sanctuary of Apollo, Delphi, is begun (approximate date). It is now at the Delphi Archaeological Museum.
 The oldest known museum labels are used.

Births 
 Aristides, Athenian statesman (d. 468 BC)
 Onomacritus, Greek compiler of oracles (approximate date) (d. 480 BC)
 Pheidippides, Greek runner (approximate date) (d. c. 490 BC)

Deaths 
 December — Cyrus the Great, ruler of Persia (b. 576 or 600 BC)
 Battus III of Cyrene, Greek king of Cyrenaica
 Spargapises, Massagetae general

References